Ellenor Susanne Svensson (born 3 February 1971 in Längbro, Örebro) is a former Swedish Olympic swimmer. She competed in the 1992 Summer Olympics, where she swam the 100 m freestyle and the 4×100 m freestyle relay. She finished 23rd in the individual event and 7th with the team.

Clubs
Norrköpings KK

References
 

1971 births
Living people
Swimmers at the 1992 Summer Olympics
Olympic swimmers of Sweden
Swedish female freestyle swimmers
Medalists at the FINA World Swimming Championships (25 m)
European Aquatics Championships medalists in swimming
Sportspeople from Örebro
20th-century Swedish women